Hotot-en-Auge (literally Hotot in Auge) is a commune in the Calvados department in the Normandy region in northwestern France. It is the namesake of the Dwarf Hotot and Blanc de Hotot breeds of Rabbit

Demographics
In 2018, the commune had 297 inhabitants.

See also
Communes of the Calvados department

References
annuaire-mairie

Communes of Calvados (department)
Calvados communes articles needing translation from French Wikipedia